Burnet Consolidated Independent School District is a public school district based in Burnet, Texas, United States.  Located in Burnet County, small portions of the district extend into Llano and Williamson counties.

In 2009, the school district was rated "academically acceptable" by the Texas Education Agency.

Schools 
Burnet High School (grades 9-12)
Burnet Middle (grades 6-8)
R.J. Richey Elementary (grades 4-5)
Shady Grove Elementary (grades 2-3)
Burnet Elementary (grades PK-1)
Bertram Elementary School (grades K-5)
2007 National Blue Ribbon School
Quest High School (alternative campus; Grades 9-12)

References

External links 
Burnet Consolidated ISD

School districts in Burnet County, Texas
School districts in Llano County, Texas
School districts in Williamson County, Texas